The Official Language Act of 1974, also known as Bill 22, was an act of the National Assembly of Quebec, commissioned by Premier Robert Bourassa, which made French the sole official language of Quebec, Canada. Provincial desire for the Official Language Act came after the repeal of Bill 63. It was ultimately supplanted by the Charter of the French Language (also known as Bill 101) in 1977, which imposed French as the only language for advertising and education (with many exceptions).

Contents  

The legislation was drafted in an attempt to follow the recommendations of the Commission of Inquiry on the Situation of the French Language and Linguistic Rights in Quebec. The act made French the official language in a number of areas:

Language of services (must be primarily offered in French)
Language of commercial signing (the use of French was required)
Language of labour relations and business (businesses wanting to deal with the state had to apply for francization programs, French must be included in all labels and communications, and your products and services need French marketing materials).
Language of instruction (English-language public school was restricted to children who had a "sufficient" knowledge of this language)
Language of legislation and justice (priority was given to French texts in case of ambiguity)

Opposition 
That English was an official language in Quebec as well was declared on July 19, 1974 by McGill University law faculty's most expert counsellors, disputing Bill 22. The testifiers were Dean Frank R. Scott; John Peters Humphrey, the chief planner of the United Nations' Universal Declaration of Human Rights;  Irwin Cotler; and four additional legal teachers:

Section 1, which provides that French is 'the official language of the province of Quebec,' is misleading in that it suggests that English is not also an official language in Quebec, which it is by virtue of Section 133 of the BNA Act and the federal Official Languages Act. ... No legislation in the National Assembly proclaiming French the sole official language in the province can affect these bilingual areas protected by the BNA Act.

John Ciaccia and George Springate were suspended from the Liberal caucus for almost two months in 1974 for voting with the Opposition when the Robert Bourassa government passed Bill 22.

See also
 Official Languages Act of Canada
 Legal dispute over Quebec's language policy
 Office québécois de la langue française
 Quiet Revolution
 Language policy

References

External links
Integral text of the Law (French-English PDF document)
Office québécois de la langue française – Repères et jalons historiques (in French)

 
Quebec provincial legislation
Quebec language policy
1974 in Canadian law
1974 in Quebec
Language legislation